The discography of The Dresden Dolls includes studio, live, and compilation albums and DVDs, as well as EPs, singles, and music videos.

Albums

Studio albums

Live albums

Compilation albums

EPs

Singles

Other appearances 

 "Pretty in Pink" (The Psychedelic Furs cover) on the album High School Reunion (2005)
 "Life on Mars" (David Bowie cover) on album 2. CONTAMINATION: A Tribute to David Bowie [Failure To Communicate Records] (2005)
 "A Night at the Roses" on album A Users Guide to The First 1 Important Records Releases (2005)
 "Ballad of a Teenage Queen"(Johnny Cash cover) with Franz Nicolay on All Aboard: A Tribute To Johnny Cash (2008)
 "New England" (Jonathan Richman cover) with Franz Nicolay on his EP St. Sebastian of the Short Stage (2009)

Videography

DVDs 

 Live: In Paradise (2005)
 Live at the Roundhouse (2007)

Music videos

References

External links 
Detailed discography

Discographies of American artists
Alternative rock discographies
Discography